Henry II (French: Henri II; 8 November 1563 – 31 July 1624), known as "the Good (le Bon)", was Duke of Lorraine from 1608 until his death. Leaving no sons, both of his daughters became Duchesses of Lorraine by marriage. He was a brother-in-law of Henry IV of France.

History and family
Henry was the son of Charles III, Duke of Lorraine, and Claude of Valois, daughter of Henry II of France and Catherine de' Medici. His paternal grandparents were Francis I, Duke of Lorraine, and Christina of Denmark.

Henry married, firstly, Catherine of Bourbon, Duchess of Albret, daughter Antoine of Navarre and Jeanne d'Albret, sister of King Henry IV of France. The couple were married at the Château de Saint Germain-en-Laye outside Paris on 31 January 1599. The bride was already 39 years of age and the union was merely to secure relations with the House of Bourbon which had previously been rivals with the House of Lorraine. As Catherine was a Protestant and Henry was a Catholic, a papal dispensation was needed for the two to marry. Pope Clement VIII refused to grant a dispensation, but Catherine's brother, Henry, convinced their illegitimate half-brother, Charles, Archbishop of Rouen, to officiate at the wedding.

Catherine died childless in 1604, aged 45. With no issue from that union, Duke Henry married, secondly, Margherita Gonzaga on 24 April 1606 in Mantua. She was the eldest daughter of Vincenzo Gonzaga, Duke of Mantua and his wife Eleonora de' Medici. Margherita's sister Eleonor Gonzaga was a future Holy Roman Empress.

Henry was succeeded by his younger brother as Francis II, Duke of Lorraine.

Issue
Henry and Margherita had four daughters, two of whom survived to adulthood:
 Stillborn daughter (February 1607).
 Nicole of Lorraine (3 October 1608 – 23 February 1657), married her cousin, Charles IV, Duke of Lorraine, separated in 1635.
 A daughter (10 February 1611 - 11 February 1611).
 Claude Françoise de Lorraine (6 October 1612 – 2 August 1648), married her cousin, Nicholas II, Duke of Lorraine,

Ancestry

References

Sources

External links

1563 births
1624 deaths
Dukes of Bar
Dukes of Lorraine
Marquesses of Nomeny
Nobility from Nancy, France
Marquesses of Pont-à-Mousson
Princes of Lorraine
16th-century French people
17th-century French people
Hereditary Princes of Lorraine